John Charles Foster (23 May 1932 – 5 June 2004) was a long-distance runner born in Liverpool, England. At first a cyclist, who didn't start running until he was 32, he represented New Zealand in the men's marathon at two Summer Olympics at Munich, West Germany (1972) and Montreal, Canada (1976). He made the team for the 1975 International Cross Country Championships, where his country took the title. A resident of Rotorua, he won the silver medal in the marathon at the 1974 Commonwealth Games in Christchurch with a master's world record time of 2:11:18.6 at the age of 41.  Two years earlier, he had set a world record for 20 miles at 1:39:14.

Foster is featured in the New Zealand short film "On the Run" about Arthur Lydiard influenced athletes.  In the final scene, Foster shows the highlight of his training is a 3,000 foot run down a 45 degree scree hill.

He was killed while riding his bicycle in Rotorua.

Achievements

Personal bests

References

External links
 New Zealand Olympic Committee

1932 births
2004 deaths
New Zealand male long-distance runners
Athletes (track and field) at the 1972 Summer Olympics
Athletes (track and field) at the 1976 Summer Olympics
Olympic athletes of New Zealand
World record setters in athletics (track and field)
Athletes (track and field) at the 1970 British Commonwealth Games
Athletes (track and field) at the 1974 British Commonwealth Games
Commonwealth Games silver medallists for New Zealand
Sportspeople from Rotorua
Road incident deaths in New Zealand
Sportspeople from Liverpool
New Zealand masters athletes
Commonwealth Games medallists in athletics
English emigrants to New Zealand
Cycling road incident deaths
Medallists at the 1974 British Commonwealth Games